K2-38b, also designated EPIC 204221263 b, is a massive rocky exoplanet closely orbiting a Sun-like star and is one of the densest planets ever found. Discovered in 2016 by Crossfield et al. and later characterized by Sinukoff et al., K2-38b is a rocky super-Earth about 55% larger than Earth (nearly 20,000 km wide) but about 12 times more massive (around 7.2*10^25 kg, a bit less than Uranus) indicating a composition rich in iron and an extremely high surface gravity. The planet is within K2 Campaign 2, in the constellation Scorpius.

Characteristics

Mass, radius, and temperature
K2-38b is a massive rocky exoplanet significantly larger and more massive than Earth. It has a radius of 1.55 , close to the 1.6  limit where planets would begin to accumulate thick hydrogen-helium atmospheres and become something similar to a Mini-Neptune. However, K2-38b is instead a very dense terrestrial planet. Initially it was believed planet is made almost entirely of iron, with a mass of about 12.0  and a density of about 17.5 g/cm3. This made it one of the densest exoplanets ever discovered. Measurement in 2020 have resulted in lower mass of 7.3 , and less extreme constraints on composition though.

Orbit
K2-38b has a very tight orbit around its host star. The planet takes just 4 days to complete a single orbit at a distance of about 0.05 AU. For comparison, Mercury orbits every 88 days at 0.38 AU from the Sun. The eccentricity of K2-38's orbit is slightly larger than that of Mars.

Host star
The parent star K2-38 is a G2 main-sequence star, similar to our own Sun. It is 1.10  and 1.07 , with a temperature of 5757 K and an unknown age. For comparison, the Sun has a temperature of 5778 K and is about 4.5 billion years old.

The visual magnitude of K2-38, or how bright it appears to the human eye, is 11.39. Therefore, it is far too dim to be seen without a telescope.

See also
Mega-Earth
K2-3d, another iron-rich planet found by the K2 mission

References

Exoplanets discovered in 2016
Exoplanets discovered by K2
Transiting exoplanets